Lucas Jaques Varone Maia (born 23 February 1993) is a Brazilian professional footballer who plays as a defender for Liga MX club Puebla.

Career
After starting his career at Resende, Maia had spells in Denmark and Malta before making his professional debut in June 2019 for Campeonato Brasileiro Série C side São José.
 In January 2020, Maia joined Ascenso MX side Cafetaleros de Chiapas. In June 2020, it was announced he would join the newly formed Liga de Expansión MX side Cancún. In December 2020, Maia joined Liga MX side Puebla on a six-month loan deal. On 27 May 2021, Maia signed a permanent deal with Puebla, agreeing a contract until 2024.

References

External links

1993 births
Brazilian footballers
Association football defenders
Footballers from Porto Alegre
Resende Futebol Clube players
Campeonato Brasileiro Série C players
Campeonato Brasileiro Série D players
Danish 1st Division players
Ascenso MX players
Liga de Expansión MX players
Vejle Boldklub players
Maltese Premier League players
Birkirkara F.C. players
Esporte Clube São José players
Cafetaleros de Chiapas footballers
Living people
Brazilian expatriate footballers
Expatriate men's footballers in Denmark
Expatriate footballers in Malta
Expatriate footballers in Mexico
Brazilian expatriate sportspeople in Denmark
Brazilian expatriate sportspeople in Mexico
Brazilian expatriate sportspeople in Malta